Elmurat Tasmuradov ( born 12 December 1991) is an Uzbekistani KazakhGreco-Roman wrestler. He competed in the 55 kg event at the 2012 Summer Olympics and was eliminated in the 1/8 finals by Péter Módos. He won a bronze medal in the 59 kg division at the 2016 Olympics. He won a gold medal four times at the Asian Championship (2013,2014,2015 and 2018) and silver medal (2012)

References

External links
 

1991 births
Living people
People from Tashkent Region
Uzbekistani male sport wrestlers
Olympic wrestlers of Uzbekistan
Wrestlers at the 2016 Summer Olympics
Wrestlers at the 2012 Summer Olympics
World Wrestling Championships medalists
Medalists at the 2016 Summer Olympics
Olympic medalists in wrestling
Olympic bronze medalists for Uzbekistan
Wrestlers at the 2014 Asian Games
Wrestlers at the 2018 Asian Games
Asian Games competitors for Uzbekistan
Asian Wrestling Championships medalists
Wrestlers at the 2020 Summer Olympics